KLOT may refer to:

 Lewis University Airport (ICAO code KLOT)
 KLOT-LP, a low-power radio station (107.7 FM) licensed to serve Cat Spring, Texas, United States